Taste is the debut album by the Irish rock band also called Taste, released in 1969. The album was produced by Tony Colton (1942-2020), a singer, songwriter and producer who was the singer in the band, Heads Hands & Feet.

Track listing
All tracks were composed by Rory Gallagher except where stated.
"Blister on the Moon" – 3:26
"Leavin' Blues" (Huddie Ledbetter, Rory Gallagher) – 4:15
"Sugar Mama" (Traditional; arranged by Rory Gallagher) – 7:14
"Hail" – 2:35
"Born on the Wrong Side of Time" – 4:00
"Dual Carriageway Pain" – 3:13
"Same Old Story" – 3:32
"Catfish" (Traditional; arranged by Rory Gallagher) – 8:04
"I'm Moving On" (Hank Snow) – 2:29

Personnel
Taste
Rory Gallagher – guitars, vocals, saxophone, harmonica
Richard "Charlie" McCracken – bass guitar
John Wilson – drums

References

1969 debut albums
Taste (band) albums
Polydor Records albums
Atco Records albums